The Eritrea clawed frog or Peracca's clawed frog (Xenopus clivii) is a species of frog in the family Pipidae found in Eritrea, Ethiopia, Kenya, and Sudan.  Its natural habitats are subtropical or tropical moist lowland forests, subtropical or tropical moist montane forests, dry savanna, moist savanna, subtropical or tropical dry shrubland, subtropical or tropical dry lowland grassland, subtropical or tropical high-altitude grassland, rivers, swamps, freshwater lakes, and freshwater marshes. It is threatened by habitat loss.

References

Xenopus
Amphibians described in 1898
Taxonomy articles created by Polbot